Shurino is a rural locality (a selo) in Dubovsky Selsoviet of Mikhaylovsky District, Amur Oblast, Russia. The population was 53 as of 2018. There are 6 streets.

Geography 
Shurino is located 27 km northeast of Poyarkovo (the district's administrative centre) by road. Voskresenovka is the nearest rural locality.

References 

Rural localities in Mikhaylovsky District, Amur Oblast